Cookin' may refer to:

 [[Cookin' (Booker Ervin album)|Cookin (Booker Ervin album)]], 1960
 [[Cookin' (Charly Antolini and Dick Morrissey album)|Cookin''' (Charly Antolini and Dick Morrissey album)]], 1989
 [[Cookin' (Paul Gonsalves album)|Cookin (Paul Gonsalves album)]], 1957
 Cookin' with the Miles Davis Quintet, a 1957 album
 Cookin' with the Miracles, a 1961 album
 "Cookin", a song by Fat Joe and Remy Ma from Plata O Plomo Nanta (theatrical show),  or Cookin'', a South Korean musical comedy show

See also
 Cooking, preparation of food for consumption